Jennifer Grout (born May 21, 1990) is an American singer of Arabic and Amazigh (Tashelhit) music.

Biography 
Born in Boston, Grout studied at the Longy School of Music of Bard College, then at the McGill University in Canada. She is the daughter of a pianist and a violinist and began studying music at 5.

In 2012 and after her summer trip to Morocco, Jennifer Grout got interested in Arabic and Amazigh culture and music. She competed in Arabs Got Talent and was a finalist in 2013, then in Shaklak Mish Ghareeb in 2014.

Songs 
Jennifer Grout has several albums and songs mostly in Amazigh (Tashelhit):

 Amz Lkhatm (take the ring)
 Nttbla (we became addicted)
 Merhba (welcome)
 How are you today

Personal life 
Jennifer Grout converted to Islam in 2013, after she met her Moroccan husband.

See also 
 Tashelhit
 Naima Moujahid
 Fatima Tabaamrant
 Raissa Kelly

References

External links 
 
 

1990 births
Living people
21st-century American singers
21st-century American women singers
American sopranos
People from Boston
Converts to Islam
Longy School of Music of Bard College alumni
McGill University alumni